The anti-Catholic riot that occurred in Bath on July 6, 1854 was one of a number that took place in coastal Maine in the 1850s, including the tarring and feathering of a Catholic priest, Father John Bapst in 1854 in the town of Ellsworth.  The first and most violent anti-Catholic riot in Maine took place in Bangor, Maine in 1834.  The resurgence of violence in the 1850s was associated with the rise of the Know-Nothing Party and the passage of the Maine law, America's first statewide prohibition ordinance.

The Bath mob was gathered and inflamed by a traveling street-preacher named John S. Orr, who called himself "The Angel Gabriel", dressed in white robes, and carried a trumpet.  Orr delivered an anti-Catholic sermon on a commercial street, the crowd of spectators eventually swelling to over a thousand and blocking carriage traffic.  Some began shouting for the mob to move on the Old South Church, a structure built by the Congregationalists in 1805 but lately abandoned by them and purchased by Irish Catholics.  In the late afternoon the crowd marched to the church, began smashing up the pews, hoisted an American flag from the belfry, rang the bell, and set it on fire. After the church was burned, a smaller crowd of at least a hundred roamed through the streets all night.  There is no record of attacks upon any Catholic persons. The event was visually recorded at the time in a series of three history paintings by local artist John Hilling.

A year after the riot, on November 18, 1855, the Catholic Bishop of Portland attempted to lay the cornerstone for a new church on the same site, but the congregation was chased away and beaten.

References

1854 in Maine
1854 riots
July 1854 events
Anti-Catholic riots in the United States
Bath, Maine
Attacks on churches in North America
Riots and civil disorder in Maine
Attacks on religious buildings and structures in the United States
Know Nothing
Anti-Catholicism in Maine
Irish-American culture in Maine